Spencer Gulf is a gulf located in South Australia.

Spencer Gulf may also refer to.

Spencer Gulf Football League, an Australian rules football league in South Australia
Spencer Gulf Important Bird Area, a designation associated with part of the east coast of Spencer Gulf
Spencer Gulf Shelf Province - a provincial bioregion listed in the Integrated Marine and Coastal Regionalisation of Australia

See also
Spencer (disambiguation)
Eastern Spencer Gulf Marine Park, a marine protected area in Spencer Gulf
Southern Spencer Gulf Marine Park, a marine protected area in Spencer Gulf
Upper Spencer Gulf Marine Park, a marine protected area in Spencer Gulf
Yatala Harbour Upper Spencer Gulf Aquatic Reserve
George Spencer, 2nd Earl Spencer